The Motet is an American funk, soul and jazz influenced group based in Denver, Colorado. Founded in 1998 by drummer and bandleader Dave Watts, The Motet is Watts, guitarist Ryan Jalbert, bassist Garrett Sayers, keyboardist Joey Porter, and saxophonist Drew Sayers.

Known for energetic live shows including an annual Halloween concert, the band has released seven studio albums. Their 2014 self-titled album was co-written and produced by all the band members, and was cut on analog recording equipment to capture their instruments' live sounds. They continue to tour nationally and have performed at festivals such as Bonnaroo, Electric Forest Festival, High Sierra Music Festival, North Coast Music Festival, Wakarusa, Rooster Walk, and Summer Camp Festival.

History

1998–2004: Founding and first albums
The Motet was founded in Boulder, Colorado, in 1998 by drummer and arranger Dave Watts as a musical collective with a rotating cast of musicians. By 2000 the group had changed its name to The Motet and become a sextet consisting of Watts on drums, percussionist and vocalist Jans Ingber, percussionist Scott Messersmith, guitarist Mike Tiernen, bassist Kurt Reeber, and organist-keyboardist Steve Vidiac. Watts, Ingber, and Messersmith had also traveled to Cuba twice to study bata drums of the Santeria religion, which at the time heavily influenced the band's sound, as can be heard on their first two albums.

The Dave Watts Motet first performed together on Halloween 1998, and at that time were incorporating elements of funk, jazz, folk, and world music into their sound. Watts wrote and arranged the majority of their early music for a rotating lineup of musicians, throwing energetic local dance parties. Their debut release, Breathe, was self-released in 1999, and produced entirely by Watts.

The band released their second album, Play, on aNOnym reCOrds in 2001, which was followed in 2002 by the album Live, their first record on Harmonized Records. Music for Life, released in 2004, was also on Harmonized Records. Also in 2004, the band self-released the DVD Shine, which was produced by James Marshello.

2006: Instrumental Dissent
On September 12, 2006, they released their studio album Instrumental Dissent. While the album is largely instrumental, the voices of activists such as Harry Belafonte, Alice Walker, and Noam Chomsky are woven into many of the songs. Allmusic gave release 3.5/5 stars and largely positive review, writing "Motet gets off to an impressive start as the opening salvo of tunes darts between funk, Afro-beat, Latin and world sounds with a slight underpinning of electronic touches, all driven by a nimble yet fiery attack." Allmusic praised the production and audio quality as well, stating "Many of the tracks blend into each other, creating a near seamless whole." Allmusic criticized the slower pace in the latter half of the disc, stating the album "loses some of the imagination, if not steam, of the early tunes, becoming a solid yet rather conventional work from a jazz-funk fusion outfit." However, "Scott Messersmith's bubbling percussion and drummer Dave Watts' elastic beats keep the heat turned up even when the tracks tend to extend longer than needed."

2009: Dig Deep
Around half of The Motet's self-released 2009 album Dig Deep features compositions written and arranged by Watts, with the drummer turned producer utilizing Ableton Live to add an electronica sound to various tracks. Allmusic gave Dig Deep 3/5 stars, stating "Covers of three Fela Kuti tunes show that this funk-world ensemble's heart lies in the tough, often horn-driven Afro-beat that dominates this set." The review acknowledges the new touches of techno, stating that Watts expands the band's sound, "in particular toward Kraftwerk-styled techno at times, also pushing into spacy areas that will likely be a bit alienating to some longtime fans." Much of the album also relies on "percussive Afro-funk" and Allmusic pointed out elements of prog rock on tracks such as "Guru."

2014: The Motet
They released their seventh studio album, The Motet, in February 2014. Each member of the band contributed to the writing process, with hundreds of hours spent in the studio creating vintage funk sounds. The group came up with the basic ideas for the album's original nine tracks in Watts's home studio, then recorded and mixed the album at Immersive Studios in Boulder, Colorado and Scanhope Sound in Littleton, Colorado. About The Motet, Watts says "The album is really like a new era for us. Writing our own music as a band, a 100 percent collaborative effort, it’s a real stepping stone to a sound we’re going to be bringing consistently” Writes Dave Kirby of the Boulder Weekly, “utterly flawless production...and not a throwaway in the bunch...ambitious, airtight and built to travel.”  Upstate Live says that The Motet’s “55 glorious minutes showcase their growth as individuals and as an unstoppable funk machine.”

2016: Totem
The Motet's record was released on July 8, 2016. The album was recorded at The Parlor Recording Studio in New Orleans, Scanhope Sound, Colorado Sound, Notably Fine Audio, and Halo Studios. Eric Krasno of Soullive produced the record and contributed two songs "So High" and "Know It Too Well".

2019: Death or Devotion 
This album was released in the beginning of 2019.

Live performances

The band has toured annually since its founding, primarily performing in the United States with six or seven live members and Dave Watts serving as bandleader.

They periodically bring special guests on stage; in January 2014, for example, they were joined on stage by drummer Jason Hann of the String Cheese Incident, trumpeter Jen Hartswick,  and vocalist and jazz trombonist Natalie Cressman.

In 2013 they played in Chicago, and performed at the now-defunct Wakarusa Music and Camping Festival. The following year the band toured the United States in support of their album The Motet, performing at festivals such as Summer Camp Festival.

Halloween concerts
Since 2001 The Motet has performed a series of concerts on Halloween weekend, typically in Colorado, covering the music of one particular band and dressing the part.  Examples have included Earth, Wind, and Fire, Parliament Funkadelic, Tower of Power, Jamiroquai, Stevie Wonder, and Prince.

The following is a list of their annual Halloween concerts:

 2000: The Beatles
 2001: The Headhunters
 2002: Stevie Wonder
 2003: Tower of Power
 2004: Prince
 2005: Michael Jackson
 2006: Madonna
 2007: Jamiroquai
 2008: Talking Heads
 2009: Sly and the Family Stone
 2010: Earth, Wind and Fire
 2011: Grateful Dead (Funk is Dead)
 2012: Parliament/Funkadelic
 2013: The Year 1980 (Mixtape 1980)
 2014: The Year 1975 (Mixtape 1975)
 2015: The Year 1977 (Mixtape 1977)
 2016: The Year 1979 (Mixtape 1979)

Members
Current
 Dave Watts drums, bandleader 
 Ryan Jalbert guitar 
 Joey Porter keys 
 Garrett Sayers bass 
 Drew Sayers tenor sax 

Past
 Gabe Mervine trumpet 
 Jans Ingber vocalist, percussion 
 Matt Pitts tenor sax 
 Dominic Lalli (Big Gigantic member) saxophone 
 Scott Messersmith percussion 
 Gregoire Raymond keys 
 Adam Revell keys 
 Mark Donovan guitar 
 Mike Tiernan guitar 
 Steve Vidiac organist/keyboardist 
 Paul McDaniel bass 
 Kurt Reeber bass 
 Matt Spencer bass 
 Alex Tomaino  guitar 
 Lyle Divinsky vocalist 
 Parris Fleming trumpet

Discography

Albums

Live albums

DVDs

Further reading
 
 
 
 
 The Motet at Allmusic

See also
 Funk music

References

External links
 

1998 establishments in Colorado
American funk musical groups
Musical groups established in 1998
Musical groups from Denver